The 2001 WNBA season was the 2nd season for the Portland Fire. The Fire failed to qualify for the WNBA Playoffs for the second consecutive year.

Offseason

WNBA Draft

Regular season

Season standings

Season schedule

Player stats

References

Portland Fire seasons
Portland
Portland Fire